Neeya 2 is a 2019 Indian Tamil romantic horror film written and directed by L. Suresh and produced by Sridhar Arunachalam under the banner of Jumbo Cinemas. The film stars Jai, Catherine Tresa, Raai Laxmi and Varalaxmi Sarathkumar. Jai plays a dual role in the film. The soundtrack was composed by Shabir, Gopi Krishna was the editor, Rajavel Mohan was the cinematographer. It is a sequel to the 1979 Kamal Haasan movie Neeya and released on 24 May 2019.

Plot 
Ichathari is a type of snake which is human by day and snake by night. They exist in the woods cursed by gods to this fate dreaming to be human.

The story revolves around Sarva, whose horoscope dangers the person he marries, since he has naga dhosham. Divya has been following around sarva for three years and he always rejects her confession. Sarva finally confesses about his dhosham to divya who says she has naga dhosham too. And they get married soon after.

Meanwhile Malar, is a woman, who grieves holding a pencilbook of sketches with a sarva lookalike. Her past flashes show them to be married and in love. She is searching for sarva who looks like her husband.
While in search, she encounters few men pretending to know sarva, who try to rape her. And we finally know that Malar is a shapehifting snake who kills them all.She is a woman by day and forced to turn as snake by night. A rishi, who uses his power to locate sarva, sees sarva and divya getting married.He doesn't tell anything to malar.

After an incident where malar spooks everyone at the apartment she's staying at night, she accidentally flees to sarva's house without realising. The snake scares sarva, and divya confesses that she lied about having naga dhosham in order to get married. They consult astrologist who tells them to go to naga temple,and also advises them to not engage in sexual activity. They coincidentally come to the place where malar is staying. Rishi finds this using his power and tells malar that sarva is married now and that she should forget him.In a fit of anger she strangles the rishi, and says he is my husband forever. 
Sarva and divya stay in a resort, malar follows them there. She dreams of sarva recognising her and leaving divya. But he doesn't recognise her at all. The rishi tells her that if she seduces sarva,he might get back his past life memory back.So Malar shapeshifts as divya and goes to seduce sarva.But her plan fails since they were not there for honeymoon.
Malar gets furious seeing the closeness of sarva and divya and scares them in the bedroom. Afterwards at night, she lures divya to the woods by taking her scarf and tries to kill her again unsuccessfully.The people of the area capture malar (in snake form) in a barrel and transport her. But she escapes from them.

It's flashback to 1993, and malar is a college student traveling in the local bus.She encounters vikram who beats up local goons for misbehaving with another girl.They soon fall in love, and due to being in different caste, her parents try to kill vikram.

On the woods, Devi and manas are two shapeshifting snakes who want to be human. For snakes to become completely human, they have to retrieve a thali from naga statute surrounded by thousand snakes who had failed before. After an ardent struggle they recover the thali but faint before tying it. Vikram and malar flee from home and vikram ties the same thali on malar. Devan tries to take it off but a fight ensues between him and vikram,who mistook him for malar's father's goon. Malar accidentally kills him , devi is distraught. She poisons vikram and curses malar to the same curse she had suffered and dies.

Malar becomes nagarani and is doomed to roam as snake at night for eternity.Malar convinces sarva to follow her,telling that she will show his previous avatars, trying to remind him of his past life with her. Malar finally tells the story to sarva. Sarva accidentally shrugs off malar ,who falls from the waterfall cliff into the lake. He gets his past memories when he tries to resucrrect her post rescue. On the other hand, divya frantically searches for her lost husband and learns that malar is actually a snake. Another rishi advices her to take a poison herself and try to bite malar. But there's no antidote for this poison. She takes the poison and hastens to kill malar. Rishi warns divya that if malar and sarva get together he will become a snake too.

As malar chases the pair, divya's poisoning becomes worse . Sarva chooses divya over malar. And Malar dies after bite a poison from Divya leg, willingly leaving Sarva and Divya in peace.

In the end, Malar says to Sarva that she had already died when you choose Divya over her and says that she died for him in last era, she is going to die for him, and owes to live with Sarva in the next era and dies with a very sad content. Because, for Vikram, she is waiting for nearly 25 years.

Cast 

Jai in a Dual role as Sarva and Vikram 
Raai Laxmi as Malar and Nagarani 
Catherine Tresa as Divya 
Varalaxmi Sarathkumar as Devi
Bala Saravanan as Purushan
Avinash as Ananda Siddhar
K. S. G. Venkatesh as Sarva's father
Manas as Devan
Nitish Veera as Vikram's enemy
Suresh Kannan
Priya Dharshini
Lokesh as Kalyanam
Settu
M. Ruban
C. M. Bala as Swamy
N. C. Neelakandan
Madurai Saroja as Malar's grandmother
Pandi Kamal as Sarva's friend
Raandilya

Production  
The first schedule of Neeya 2 was shot in Pondicherry, and the subsequent ones were completed in Talakonam, Chennai, Madurai, and Chalakudy. The second schedule began on February 6 and the shoot go on until February 22. Jai plays the lead and will be seen in two different dimensions, Varalaxmi Sarathkumar portrays a snake woman. Raai Laxmi and Catherine Tresa are the other female lead roles. Bala Saravanan will be providing comedy. Director L. Suresh informed, “The grandeur is nowhere going to be seen as a gaudy factor. But the script demands such elements, which will definitely be a great experience to the audiences. One of the greatest highlights of this film is a 22-ft CGI motion captured serpent to be seen in an important role and will be seen throughout the movie. To make sure that we got the exact serpent as we imagined, cinematographer Rajevel and I had to travel across different places of India and Thailand. Finally, we happened to find the exact one in Bangkok.  It took enough time to understand its physique, body language and nature. We’re sure its appearance and presence throughout the film would be an enjoyable experience for universal audiences.”

Soundtrack 
The soundtrack was composed by Shabir in his second film composed after Sagaa.

Marketing 
The first look poster of Neeya 2 shows Varalaxmi in a cobra posture. The official teaser of Neeya 2 was released on 29 August 2018.

Release 
Neeya 2 was released on May 10, 2019.

References 

2019 films
2010s Tamil-language films
Indian romantic horror films
Films set in a fictional location
Films about shapeshifting
Indian horror thriller films
Indian supernatural horror films
Indian supernatural thriller films
2019 horror thriller films
2010s supernatural thriller films
2010s supernatural horror films